9/12 was a podcast hosted by Dan Taberski.

9/12 may also refer to:

September 12 (month-day date notation)
December 9 (day-month date notation)
9-12 Project, a group created by American television and radio personality Glenn Beck

See also
12/9 (disambiguation)